Yanda may refer to:

 Yanda people, an ethnic group of Australia
 Yanda language, an indigenous Australian language
 Yanda County, a subdivision of New South Wales, Australia
 Yanda Parish (Yanda County)
 Yanda Airlines, a former regional airline of Australia

People with the name 
 Deng Yanda, Chinese military officer
 Marshal Yanda, American football player
 Yanda Li, Chinese scientist
 Yanda Nossiter, Australian canoeist
 Yanda Pyissi, 13th-century Burmese official